Wraxall  may refer to:

People
Baron Wraxall, a title in the Peerage of the United Kingdom
Wraxall baronets, of Somerset, England
Peter Wraxall (died 1759), English official in New York Province
Nathaniel Wraxall (died 1831), English author and baronet

Places in England
Wraxall, Dorset, a civil parish including Higher Wraxall and Lower Wraxall
Wraxall and Failand, a civil parish in North Somerset, near Nailsea
Wraxall, Somerset, a village in the parish
Wraxall, Ditcheat, a hamlet in Ditcheat parish, Somerset, near Castle Cary

See also
South Wraxall, Wiltshire, England
South Wraxall Manor
North Wraxall, Wiltshire
Upper Wraxall, Wiltshire